The National Association of Minority Auto Dealers (NAMAD) was developed to assist in promoting minority auto dealers in the United States.

The auto industry in the United States is a $1,000,000 million business, which employs a huge percentage of America's work force.  The jobs in the auto industry range from manual labor positions to sales and leasing specialists, and also various managerial positions.  NAMAD is a group that was formed to establish African Americans and other minorities in this progressive business.  NAMAD was founded in 1980 and has grown to a membership of 650 minorities seeking to obtain their own dealerships.  In recent years, 100 minorities who have been in positions of power have employed over 10,000 employees, and generated over $6,000 million in sales.  This has had a great effect on the economy and also assisted in making a great name for NAMAD.  This has afforded a bright future for this organization, and with appropriate cooperation this organization will continue to flourish.

NAMAD has had a mission of not only assisting in promoting minority dealers but also to help promote equality.  The United States auto industry is predominantly white owned and operated, and has been since its initial launch.  With this newly found organization on the scene it now creates a new pathway for current students.  With various job opportunities available to minority youth today, this paves the way for a new secure job venture.  In the auto industries continued success, NAMAD is creating future positions which have the ability to be equal and minority owned and operated.  In today's society with more and more equality in everyday life, an opportunity has been captured and allowed for many successful futures to come. With minority dealers in place, this can assure positive employment opportunities for all minorities, with fair wages and great benefits.

See also 

Automobile Dealer Economic Rights Restoration Act

References 

 NAMAD
 Minority ADA
 Restore Dealer Economic Rights

Occupational organizations
Trade associations based in the United States